The GERB—SDS is a Bulgarian two-party political coalition headed by Boyko Borisov.

History 

A coalition between the two parties was formed ahead of the 2019 European Parliament election in Bulgaria,. On 28 March 2019, an agreement between the two parties was officially signed. In the election, the coalition won first place and received 6 EP seats: 5 went to GERB, 1 to SDS.

Party cooperation continued ahead of the April 2021 parliamentary election. The coalition has also signed the political partnership agreements with George's Day Movement, United Agrarians, the Movement for the Unity of the People and the Union of Repressed by Communism "Pamet" The coalition lists were registered in the electoral districts of the country on 1 March 2021. In the election, the coalition won 75 seats out of 240.

The George's Day Movement movement entered into a coalition ahead of the snap July 2021 parliamentary election. The slogan of the coalition was "Order in the midst of chaos." As a result of the election, the coalition received 63 seats in parliament, losing to the There Is Such a People party, which received 65 seats.

The coalition also participated in the 2021 general presidential and parliamentary election. Coalition candidate Anastas Gerdzhikov finished second in the second round of the presidential election.

GERB—SDS won the 2022  parliamentary election and its member Vezhdi Rashidov became the Chairperson of the National Assembly.

References

2019 establishments in Bulgaria
Conservative parties in Bulgaria
GERB
Political parties established in 2019
Political party alliances in Bulgaria
Pro-European political parties in Bulgaria
Union of Democratic Forces (Bulgaria)